Helichus naviculus, is a species of long-toed water beetle found in Sri Lanka. Larva can be found under stones in the cascades in freshwater.

References 

Dytiscidae
Insects of Sri Lanka
Insects described in 1973